Abtsdorfer See is a lake in the region of Rupertiwinkel in Bavaria, Germany. At an elevation of 426.20 m, its surface area is 0.84 km².

Sources

Lakes of Bavaria
LAbtsdorfersee